Tulsiram Dashrath Kamble (born 8 March 1922) is an Indian politician. He was elected to the Lok Sabha, the lower house of the Parliament of India as a member of the Indian National Congress.

References

External links
Official biographical sketch in Parliament of India website

1922 births
Possibly living people
India MPs 1962–1967
India MPs 1967–1970
India MPs 1971–1977
Lok Sabha members from Maharashtra